"Sleep on the Floor" is a single by American folk rock band The Lumineers from their second studio album Cleopatra. The song was released on November 16, 2016, by Dualtone Records, with the accompanying music video being released the same day. The song was written by members Wesley Schultz and Jeremiah Fraites, and produced by Simone Felice.

Music video 
The official music video was released via the Lumineers' YouTube and Vevo accounts on November 16, 2016. As of August 2021, it has gained over 170 million views. The music video was directed by Isaac Ravishankara, who also directed The Ballad of Cleopatra videos compilation, starring Elise Eberle and Adam C. Lively.

The clip begins with a scene of a girl attending her father's funeral, then her boyfriend tells her "If we don't leave now, you may never make it out". Then the girl goes with him into a car and they drive throughout all the state; after some mechanical problems with their car, they finally arrive at a house where they spend the night. The same night they get married; the music video ends with them going to sleep on the house's floor but when it dawns, she was the only one laying down on the floor. This means the rest of the video was what could’ve happened if she left with her boyfriend.

Personnel 
Credits adapted from Cleopatra liner notes.

The Lumineers

Wesley Schultz – lead vocals, guitar
Jeremiah Fraites – drums, percussion, piano
Neyla Pekarek – cello, vocals

Additional Musicians

 Byron Isaacs – bass guitar, background vocalist
Simon Felice – percussion
David Baron – keyboards
Lauren Jacobson – strings

Production

 Simone Felice – production
Bod Ludwig – mastering
Ryan Hewitt – mixing, recording
Chad Cuttill – mixing assistance

Recording

 Recorded at Clubhouse Recording Studios
 Mixed at House of Blues Studios, Nashville, TN
 Mastered at Gateway Mastering

Charts

Weekly charts

Year-end charts

Certifications

References 

The Lumineers songs
2016 singles
2016 songs